Sheila Abdus-Salaam (March 14, 1952 – April 12, 2017) was an American lawyer and judge. In 2013, after having served on the New York City Civil Court, the New York Supreme Court, and the Appellate Division, Abdus-Salaam was nominated to the New York Court of Appeals (New York's highest court) and was unanimously confirmed as an Associate Judge by the New York State Senate. She was the first African-American female judge to serve on the New York Court of Appeals.

Early life and education
Sheila Turner was born on March 14, 1952, in Washington, D.C., where she grew up in a working-class family with six siblings. She attended public schools there, graduating from Eastern High School in 1970. While researching her family history as a child, she learned that her great-grandfather was a slave in Virginia.

Turner obtained a bachelor's degree from Barnard College in 1974 and graduated from Columbia Law School in 1977. Among her classmates at Columbia was Eric Holder, the future United States Attorney General.

Career
Turner took her first husband's surname, Abdus-Salaam, and retained it during her professional career.

Before joining the bench, Abdus-Salaam worked as a staff attorney for Brooklyn Legal Services and served in the New York State Department of Law as an assistant attorney general in the civil rights and real estate financing bureaus. She subsequently served on the New York City Civil Court, from 1992 to 1993. Abdus-Salaam was elected a justice of the New York Supreme Court in 1993, and served in that capacity from 1993 to 2009. In 2009, she was designated as a justice of the Appellate Division of the New York Supreme Court, First Judicial Department by Governor David Paterson. She served as an associate justice of the Appellate Division from 2009 until 2013.

On April 5, 2013, following the death of New York Court of Appeals Judge Theodore T. Jones, Abdus-Salaam was nominated by Governor Andrew Cuomo to fill the resulting vacancy on New York's highest court. She was confirmed by the New York State Senate without opposition in a voice vote held May 6, 2013. She became the first female African-American judge to serve on the New York Court of Appeals.

Abdus-Salaam was seen as a liberal voice on the bench. In 2016, she authored the opinion of the Court in In Re Brooke S.B. v. Elizabeth A. C.C., a landmark decision allowing the domestic partners of biological parents to seek child custody or visitation in circumstances where the partners had decided to conceive and raise a child together.

Personal life
Abdus-Salaam's second husband, James Hatcher, was the son of Andrew Hatcher, who worked as a press officer for John F. Kennedy. Her third husband was Hector Nova, from whom she was divorced in 2005. Abdus-Salaam married her fourth husband, Episcopal priest Gregory A. Jacobs, in June 2016.

Abdus-Salaam's religious affiliation has been the subject of conflicting reports. While it was widely reported that Abdus-Salaam was the first Muslim to serve as a judge of the New York Court of Appeals, it appears that these reports were incorrect. Following Abdus-Salaam's death, Court of Appeals spokesperson Gary Spencer stated that she had never converted to Islam, but had merely retained the last name of her first husband. However, in an article on Abdus-Salaam's death, NBC News described Abdus-Salaam as "the first Muslim woman to serve as a U.S. judge" and added that her family asserted that she "[had] not been a practicing Muslim for 20 years".

Death
Abdus-Salaam was found dead near West 132nd Street in Manhattan on the afternoon of April 12, 2017. Her fully clothed body was found floating in the Hudson River hours after she was reported missing from her home in Harlem.

On April 13, police stated that the death of Abdus-Salaam appeared to be a suicide, and added that she had been struggling with depression. On April 18, however, police told reporters that the death was considered "suspicious" due to the lack of witnesses and lack of a suicide note. An autopsy, while reaching no conclusion about the cause of Abdus-Salaam's death, found bruises on her neck and water in her lungs; this data indicated that she had likely been alive when she entered the river. The bruising could have been caused by someone choking Abdus-Salaam, or could have resulted from the recovery of her body from the river. On April 21, police said they had recovered video from the night of April 11 that showed Abdus-Salaam, dressed in the clothes in which she was found dead, walking around Riverbank State Park along the Hudson River for hours. Police added that the final images captured by the camera showed her standing near the water.

On May 3, the New York Police Department announced that its investigation into the death of Abdus-Salaam was complete, and that investigators believed she had committed suicide. The medical examiner concluded that the cause of death was drowning and that the manner of death was suicide.

See also
List of African-American jurists
List of first women lawyers and judges in New York

References

Further reading

External links
 Hon. Sheila Abdus-Salaam profile, nycourts.gov
 

1952 births
2017 deaths
2017 suicides
20th-century American judges
20th-century American lawyers
20th-century American women lawyers
20th-century American women judges
21st-century American judges
21st-century American lawyers
21st-century American women lawyers
21st-century American women judges
African-American judges
African-American lawyers
African-American women lawyers
Barnard College alumni
Columbia Law School alumni
Judges of the New York Court of Appeals
Lawyers from Washington, D.C.
New York Supreme Court Justices
People from Harlem
Suicides by drowning in the United States
Suicides in New York City
20th-century African-American women
20th-century African-American people
21st-century African-American women
21st-century African-American people
Eastern High School (Washington, D.C.) alumni